Night Club may refer to:
 Nightclub, or discothèque, an entertainment venue
 The Night Club, a 1925  silent film
 The Night Club (novel), a 1933 novel by Georges Simenon
 Night Club (novel), a 1945 novel by Peter Cheyney
 Night Club (1952 film), an Australian musical film
 Night Club (1989 film), a 1989 Italian film directed by Sergio Corbucci
 Night Club (2011 film), an American comedy film
 Night Club (band), an American electronic band
 Night Club (Mr. President album), 1997

See also
 Nightclub two step (NC2S), a partner dance
 Night (disambiguation)
 Club (disambiguation)